Håvard Vad Petersson (born 5 January 1984 in Oslo) is a Norwegian curler from Arendal who was the long time lead for Team Thomas Ulsrud. He is currently the coach of the Peter de Cruz rink.

At the junior level, Petersson played lead for Team Thomas Løvold and won gold medals at the 2002 and 2003 World Junior Curling Championships "B" tournaments. In 2004, he competed as skip for the first time at the World Junior Curling Championship, finishing in sixth place.

With Team Ulsrud during the 2007–2010 seasons, Petersson won six World Curling Tour events, three European Curling Championship medals (silver in 2007 and 2008; bronze in 2009), three World Curling Championship medals (bronze in 2008 and 2009; silver in 2010), and silver at the 2010 Vancouver Winter Olympics. His shooting accuracy proved to be consistently high in the 80–90 percentiles during the 2009–10 season, which significantly contributed to his team's top round-robin standings at the 2009 European Curling Championship and 2010 World Curling Championship.

Petersson's ability to achieve athletic excellence despite being able to see out of only one eye is often a topic of discussion for sports commentators.

Personal life
Petersson is married to Kristin Olstad and has two children. Before coaching, he was employed as a businessman, and owned Smoothie Xchange/Funky Frozen Yogurt.

Teams

References

External links
 
 
 
 
 Complete coverages of Team Norway's Olympics performances at the official Vancouver Olympic Games 2010 Channel
 Håvard Vad Petersson and Thomas Ulrud interviewed on Eurosport Norge. "EurosportNorge møter curlinggutta". 4 December 2009.
 Håvard Vad Petersson interviewed on Eurosport Norge. "EurosportNorge om hvordan curling fungerer". 4 December 2009.
 Team Norway interviewed on Grand Slam of Curling. Olympic Curling – Team Norway. 17 February 2010.

Living people
Norwegian male curlers
Curlers at the 2010 Winter Olympics
Curlers at the 2014 Winter Olympics
Curlers at the 2018 Winter Olympics
1984 births
Olympic curlers of Norway
Olympic silver medalists for Norway
Olympic medalists in curling
Medalists at the 2010 Winter Olympics
World curling champions
People from Arendal
Sportspeople from Oslo
Continental Cup of Curling participants
European curling champions
Norwegian curling coaches